Abashevo (Apaş) is a rural locality (a selo) and the administrative center of Abashevskoye Rural Settlement of Cheboksarsky District, Chuvash Republic, Russia. The population was 851 as of 2012. There are 9 streets.

Geography 
Abashevo is located on the left bank of the Ryksha River, 7 km southeast of Kugesi (the district's administrative centre) by road. Zavrazhnoye is the nearest rural locality.

References 

Rural localities in Chuvashia
Indo-Iranian archaeological sites
Cheboksarsky Uyezd